Stanley Lechtzin (born 1936) is an American artist, jeweler, metalsmith and educator. He is noted for his work in electroforming and computer aided design (CAD) and computer aided manufacture (CAM). He has taught at Temple University in the Tyler School of Art and Architecture, from 1962.

Early life and education 
Stanley was born in 1936 in Detroit, Michigan, to an observant Jewish family.  He first encountered jewelry and metalsmithing at Cass Technical High School. After high school Lechtzin worked as a draftsman and cartographer.  While working for the City of Detroit Public Lighting Commission he realized that he did not want to continue that career path, so he began taking night courses at Wayne State University in Detroit. He set up a studio and began taking commissions upon graduation. He soon entered the Cranbrook Academy of Art, where much of his graduate work dealt with ferrous metals and stainless steel flatware.

Career 
Upon graduation from Cranbrook Academy of Art, Lechtzin accepted a teaching position in 1962 at Tyler School of Art at Temple University in Philadelphia, Pennsylvania. In 2009, he was awarded the SNAG Lifetime Achievement Award.

His work can be found in public museum collections including at the Museum of Arts and Design, the Cooper-Hewitt Museum, Smithsonian American Art Museum, Metropolitan Museum of Art, Yale University Art Gallery, and the Philadelphia Museum of Art.

Solo exhibitions 
Select list of solo exhibitions

 2009: The Philadelphia Art Alliance
 1984: The University of Pittsburgh Art Gallery
 1984: Southern Alleghenies Museum of Art (Loretto, PA)
 1984: William Penn Museum (Harrisburg, PA)
 1984: The Works Gallery (Philadelphia)
 1973: Tyler School of Art, Temple University
 1973: Goldsmiths' Hall (London, England)
 1969: Boston Museum School (Boston, Mass.)
 1969: Ball State University (Muncie, Indiana)
 1969: Lee Nordness Galleries (New York, NY)
 1968: William Penn Museum (Harrisburg, PA)
 1967: University of California (Berkeley, CA)
 1966: Pennsylvania State University (State College, PA)
 1965: Museum of Contemporary Crafts (New York, NY)
 1963: Art Center, Kalamazoo Institute of Arts (Michigan)
 1962: Carnegie Institute of Technology (Pittsburgh, PA.)

References 

1936 births
Living people
Artists from Detroit
American jewellers
Jewish American artists
Wayne State University alumni
Cranbrook Academy of Art alumni
Temple University faculty
21st-century American Jews